Rhagoba obvellata is a moth in the family Crambidae. It was described by Xi-Cui Du and Hou-Hun Li in 2012. It is found in Tibet, China.

References

Spilomelinae
Moths described in 2012
Moths of Asia